Crystal Style is Crystal Kay's fifth studio album. Unlike Crystal's last three albums, this record is more pop oriented and features more foreign producers, including Ashley Ingram and Jamelia. It was released in two different versions: a regular CD edition and a limited CD+DVD edition containing an English version of "MAKE YOU MINE", a DVD with her recent music videos, and a slipcase. There were only two singles released leading up to Crystal's Style.

The album reached #2 on the Oricon weekly charts, where it charted for 31 weeks. As it sold 296,756 copies in 2005, it became the #44 best selling album of that year.

Track listing

Charts

Release history

External links

References

2005 albums
Crystal Kay albums
Epic Records albums